Kolchiki (before 1928: Πλησεβίτσα - Plisevitsa) is a village in Florina regional unit, Western Macedonia, Greece.

According to the statistics of Vasil Kanchov ("Macedonia, Ethnography and Statistics"), 700 Muslim Albanians lived in the village in 1900.
The Greek census (1920) recorded 563 people in the village and in 1923 there were 563 inhabitants (or 103 families) who were Muslim. Following the Greek-Turkish population exchange, in 1926 within Plisevitsa there were 92 refugee families from the Caucasus. The Greek census (1928) recorded 352 village inhabitants. There were 95 refugee families (367 people) in 1928. 

Kolchiki had 315 inhabitants in 1981. In fieldwork done by Riki Van Boeschoten in late 1993, Kolchiki was populated by a Greek population descended from Anatolian Greek refugees who arrived during the population exchange. Pontic Greek was spoken in the village by people over 30 in public and private settings. Children understood the language, but mostly did not use it.

References

Populated places in Florina (regional unit)